Robyn Alice McCutcheon (born Robert Allen McCutcheon) is an American diplomat, engineer and historian.

She received her master's degrees in astronomy from Yale University and master's degrees in Russian studies from Georgetown University. She was previously an astronomer and historian. She is known for her work on the history of Soviet astronomy. She also has several publications to her credit on the history of Soviet and Russian science during the Stalin period. She became a member of the American Astronomical Society (AAS) in 1983 and was a member of the Historical Astronomy Division (HAD) of the AAS and chair of the AAS International Relations Committee. She formerly worked at the Space Telescope Science Institute and the Computer Sciences Corporation. She also worked as an engineer on NASA missions, primarily Hubble Space Telescope.

She joined the US Department of State in 2004 and became a Foreign Service Officer in several countries, including Russia, Romania, Kazakhstan. She served at the Nuclear Risk Reduction Center in 2013–14. McCutcheon is a trans woman and is the first person to transition while posted overseas. She transitioned in 2011 in Romania. She also served as president of the GLIFAA (Gays and Lesbians in Foreign Affairs Agencies).

Publications
McCutcheon, Robert A. "The 1936-1937 purge of Soviet astronomers." Slavic Review 50, no. 1 (1991): 100-117. 
Bronshten, Vitalii A., and Robert A. McCutcheon. "VT Ter-Oganezov, ideologist of Soviet astronomy." Journal for the History of Astronomy 26, no. 4 (1995): 325-348.
Doel, Ronald. E., and Robert A. McCutcheon, eds. "Astronomy and the State: CIS Perspectives," a special issue of Journal for the History of Astronomy, no. 4 (1995).
McCutcheon, Robert. (August 19, 2003). "Russia’s Astronomy Icon Nears Rebirth". Sky & Telescope

References

American diplomats
Transgender women
Living people
Year of birth missing (living people)
Transgender scientists
Georgetown University alumni
20th-century American astronomers
American women astronomers
American women diplomats
NASA people